Prescott is an unincorporated community in St. Clair County, Alabama, United States.

History
A post office operated under the name Prescott from 1914 to 1918.

References

Unincorporated communities in St. Clair County, Alabama
Unincorporated communities in Alabama